Doab Samsami District is in Kuhrang County, Chaharmahal and Bakhtiari province, Iran. The National Census of 2011 counted 4,065 people in 938 households. At the latest census in 2016, the district had 5,930 inhabitants living in 1,926 households.

References 

Kuhrang County

Districts of Chaharmahal and Bakhtiari Province

Populated places in Chaharmahal and Bakhtiari Province

Populated places in Kuhrang County

fa:بخش دوآب صمصامي